Eastern Green is a mainly residential suburb in the far west of Coventry, England, and was formerly a village in Warwickshire. Its most western area is Upper Eastern Green and the eastern area is Lower Eastern Green, though residents generally do not distinguish between the two. 

The sub-district of Mount Nod is located between Lower Eastern Green and the A45 Coventry to Birmingham dual-carriageway (the area east of Alderminster Road). The suburb of Tile Hill North is to the south and the districts of Allesley, Allesley Green and Whoberley lie to the north and east. To the west is the boundary of the Metropolitan Borough of Solihull, including the village of Berkswell.

A stream (‘Alles Brook’) runs from west to east through the middle of the district, and is known locally as 'The Brook.' For parts of its course, the brook is set in a narrow band of green land set with shrubbery and trees. It is a tributary of the River Sherbourne.

National Express Coventry route 10 serves the area, with services running to Whoberley, Spon End and Coventry city centre.

Church of St Andrew

The Church of St Andrew, Upper Eastern Green, established in 1875, is on the western border of Coventry. It overlooks farmland and Solihull to the west. An infant school also named St Andrew's is situated adjacent to the eastern side of the church grounds.

References

Suburbs of Coventry